The Prix Joseph Kessel is a prize in French language literature, given to "a book of a high literary value written in French".

The jury includes or has included among its members Tahar Ben Jelloun, Jean-Marie Drot, Michèle Kahn, Pierre Haski, Gilles Lapouge, Michel Le Bris, Érik Orsenna, Patrick Rambaud, Jean-Christophe Rufin, André Velter and Olivier Weber.

Joseph-Kessel Prize winners

References

French fiction awards
First book awards
Short story awards
French poetry awards
Biography awards